Toguz-Toro is a district of Jalal-Abad Region in western Kyrgyzstan. The administrative seat lies at Kazarman.

Population

Rural communities and villages
In total, Toguz-Toro District includes 14 settlements in 5 rural communities. Each rural community can consist of one or several villages. The rural communities and settlements in the Toguz-Toro District are:

 Atay (seat: Atay; incl. Karl Marks)
 Kök-Irim (seat: Aral; incl. Birdik)
 Kargalyk (seat: Kazarman; incl. Kyzyl-Jyldyz, Makmal and Chet-Bulak)
 Sary-Bulung (seat: Kara-Suu; incl. Tabylgyty)
 Toguz-Toro (seat: Dödömöl; incl. Kosh-Bulak, Lenin and Örnök)

References 

Districts of Jalal-Abad Region